Yuvraj Singh Dhesi (born July 19, 1986) is a Canadian professional wrestler currently signed to WWE, where he performs on the NXT brand, under the ring name Jinder Mahal, as the leader of Indus Sher.

Having started his career on the independent circuit, Mahal joined WWE in 2010 and made his debut on the company's main roster the following year. After a short-lived alliance with his kayfabe brother-in-law The Great Khali, he formed the stable 3MB with fellow wrestlers Heath Slater and Drew McIntyre, before he and McIntyre were released from the company in 2014. Mahal returned to WWE in 2016 with a drastically improved physique and received a push, culminating in him capturing the WWE Championship from Randy Orton in April 2017, making him the 50th WWE Champion and the first of Indian descent. His reign lasted approximately six months, and he would then go on to win the WWE United States Championship at WrestleMania 34 in 2018 and the WWE 24/7 Championship twice in 2019.

Early life 
Yuvraj Singh Dhesi was born on July 19, 1986 in Calgary, Alberta, Canada. He is of Indian Punjabi Sikh descent. He holds a business degree in communications and culture from the University of Calgary. His uncle, Gama Singh, was considered a legendary wrestling villain in the original Stampede Wrestling and wrestled around the world (and briefly for the WWF, now WWE) in the 1980s.

Professional wrestling career

Early career (2002–2010) 
Growing up in a wrestling family, Dhesi began his professional wrestling career at the Martial Arts Fitness Center in Calgary, training with Rick Bognar. He debuted in Premier Martial Arts Wrestling (PMW) as "Raj Dhesi" and then went on to train with Allen Coage and Gerry Morrow, wrestling in a revived Stampede Wrestling alongside fellow future WWE wrestlers Natalya, Tyson Kidd, and Viktor. As "Tiger Raj Singh", he won various tag team championships in Stampede and Prairie Wrestling Alliance (PWA), spending much of his early career teaming with his cousin Gama Singh Jr. They were known as The New Karachi Vice and also as Sikh & Destroy, winning the PWA Canadian Tag Team Championship. In PWA, he was the PWA Heavyweight Champion from 2008 until January 2010 and also spent time in Great North Wrestling (GNW), where he feuded with wrestlers such as Hannibal and Samoa Joe.

World Wrestling Entertainment / WWE

Florida Championship Wrestling (2010–2011) 

Dhesi tried out for WWE's developmental promotion Florida Championship Wrestling (FCW). At the tryout, he believed that his Punjabi gimmick and promos made him stand out, stating that he "came out wearing a turban and had [his] full outfit on" and that "they like guys who speak different languages and have different looks". In February 2010, he signed to a developmental contract with FCW under the ring name Jinder Mahal and wrestled there for a year.

Early feuds (2011–2012) 

Mahal made his televised WWE debut on the April 29, 2011 episode of SmackDown, greeting backstage fellow Indian wrestler The Great Khali and his manager Ranjin Singh by speaking in Punjabi that he was really happy and excited to see Khali and Ranjin. The next week on SmackDown, Mahal, unimpressed by how Khali and Singh have been partaking in childish activities instead of winning matches, confronted Singh about his mismanagement of Khali, establishing himself as a heel. Mahal interrupted a Khali Kiss Cam segment the following week on SmackDown, slapping Khali twice. On the May 20 episode of SmackDown, Mahal interrupted Khali's match against Jey Uso, leading to Khali confronting Mahal. On his first televised match on the June 17 episode of SmackDown, Mahal defeated Vladimir Kozlov and on the July 1 episode of SmackDown it was revealed that Mahal was married to Khali's sister, making them (kayfabe) brothers-in-law. On the September 5 episode of Raw, he suffered his first loss when he and Khali lost to WWE Tag Team Champions Evan Bourne and Kofi Kingston in a non-title match. In a rematch on SmackDown, they lost again to Bourne and Kingston, leading Khali to walk away from Mahal after the match, thus ending their alliance. On the September 16 episode of SmackDown, Mahal attacked Khali during his match with Heath Slater which Khali won by disqualification. On the September 23 episode of SmackDown, Mahal suffered his first loss in a singles match to Khali. On the October 14 episode of SmackDown, Mahal competed in a 41-man battle royal and Mahal made it to the final three before being eliminated by Randy Orton.

In November, Mahal targeted wrestlers whom he deemed as beneath him or embarrassing and in November began a feud with Ted DiBiase. On the December 30 episode of Smackdown, Mahal broke DiBiase's winning streak via submission to end their feud. In December, Mahal tried to make a name for himself and went after Sheamus, constantly disrespecting him, but was defeated and for several months they were involved in multiple matches, with Sheamus always getting the best of Mahal. At Mahal's first Royal Rumble on January 29, 2012, he was eliminated by The Great Khali, rekindling their feud and leading to a match on the February 3 episode of SmackDown, which Mahal lost. At Over the Limit on May 20, Mahal participated in and lost a battle royal match where the winner was to receive a shot at the Intercontinental Championship or the United States Championship when he was again eliminated by The Great Khali.

In late April, Mahal began confronting several wrestlers, starting with Randy Orton, interrupting one of his promos and being attacked in retaliation with an RKO. On July 23 at Raw 1000, Mahal confronted Kane, leading a group consisting of Camacho, Curt Hawkins, Drew McIntyre, Hunico and Tyler Reks and claiming none of them had been given an opportunity within WWE and would make one by taking down Kane, but The Undertaker's sudden appearance halted their advance and The Brothers of Destruction attacked the group and took them out. On the July 27 episode of SmackDown, Mahal lost to Ryback by countout and then began a feud with him, winning by intentional countout and disqualification. To try and prove himself to Ryback, Mahal requested a match against two local wrestlers in a match style similar to Ryback's, defeating them quickly by submission. In spite of this, Mahal continued his feud with Ryback, attacking him during their matches and after Ryback's, but was ultimately pinned by Ryback on the August 24 episode of SmackDown to end their feud.

When WWE rebranded its developmental territory FCW into NXT, Mahal began appearing on the rebooted NXT, where he started a winning streak by defeating several wrestlers, including Derrick Bateman and Percy Watson. On the August 8 episode of NXT, Mahal was inserted into the Gold Rush tournament to crown the first NXT Champion, where he defeated Bo Dallas in the first round. On the August 15 episode of NXT, Mahal defeated Richie Steamboat in the semi-finals of the Gold Rush Tournament. On the August 29 episode of NXT, Mahal was defeated by Seth Rollins in the finals of the Gold Rush Tournament, thus ending his NXT winning streak. At the Night of Champions pre-show on September 16, Mahal competed in the 16-man battle royal to become number one contender for the United States Championship, but was eliminated by Brodus Clay.

3MB (2012–2014) 

On the September 21 episode of SmackDown, Mahal and Drew McIntyre interfered in Heath Slater's match against Brodus Clay by attacking Clay. The alliance of Mahal, Slater and McIntyre were later named 3MB. From October 2012, 3MB racked up many wins against Team Co-Bro (Santino Marella and Zack Ryder) and The Usos (Jey and Jimmy Uso), all of them due to illegal interference. At the Survivor Series pre-show on November 18, Mahal and Slater defeated Marella and Ryder when Mahal pinned Ryder. At TLC: Tables, Ladders & Chairs on December 16, 3MB were defeated by the team of Alberto Del Rio, The Brooklyn Brawler and The Miz. The next night on Raw at the Slammy Awards show, 3MB lost to Del Rio, Miz and Tommy Dreamer. Mahal competed in the 30-man Royal Rumble match at the Royal Rumble on January 27, 2013, by entering at number 27, but was eliminated by Sheamus. On the April 12 episode of SmackDown, in an attempt to make a name for themselves, 3MB tried to attack Triple H, but were attacked themselves by The Shield (Dean Ambrose, Roman Reigns and Seth Rollins). On the April 15 episode of Raw, 3MB called out The Shield, only for Brock Lesnar to come out instead and attack the group. At the Night of Champions pre-show on September 15, 3MB (Drew McIntyre and Heath Slater) competed in a number one contenders tag team turmoil match for the WWE Tag Team Championship, in which they were the last team eliminated by Tons of Funk (Brodus Clay and Tensai).

In late 2013, 3MB began adopting new ring names against their opponents, although their misfortunes and amounting losses remained the same. At WrestleMania XXX on April 6, Mahal competed in the André the Giant Memorial battle royal, but was eliminated by Mark Henry. In April, 3MB formed an alliance with Hornswoggle to feud with Los Matadores (Diego and Fernando). On June 12, Mahal was released from his WWE contract.

Independent circuit (2014–2016) 

Dhesi wrestled for Reality of Wrestling (ROW) under the name Raj Singh at their summer iPPV, ROW Summer of Champions 2014, defeating Jasper Davis. On October 24 at All Star Wrestling (ASW) in Vancouver BC at the live event Fright Night Live, Singh teamed with his cousin Gama Singh Jr. to defeat Kyle Sebastian and Collin Cutler to win the ASW Tag Team Championship. Between 2014 and 2015, he appeared in Puerto Rican promotion the World Wrestling Council (WWC) against local star Ray Gonzalez. He also participated in Qatar Pro Wrestling (QPW) Souq Waqif Championship tournament in April 2015, where he ended up as first runner up. On May 5, Singh made his debut for Japanese promotion Inoki Genome Federation (IGF), losing to Wang Bin. In 2016, he also wrestled for The Great Khali's wrestling promotion Continental Wrestling Entertainment (CWE) in India.

In a 2017 interview on Chris Jericho's Talk is Jericho podcast, Mahal revealed that he "hit rock bottom" during his time in the independent circuit. He also mentioned that he stopped drinking alcohol and began working out and eating cleaner, losing 20 pounds in the process, two months prior to WWE calling him to return.

Return to WWE

The Man of Peace (2016–2017) 
On July 27, Mahal re-signed with the WWE. On the August 1 episode of Raw, Mahal returned to television alongside Heath Slater, demanding contracts until Raw General Manager Mick Foley informed the pair that they had to face each other in a match for a Raw contract, which Mahal won. Throughout the rest of the month on Raw, Mahal began losing to the likes of Neville, Sami Zayn and Darren Young. Mahal then adopted the gimmick of a "man who comes in peace", advocating peace and tranquility. On the September 12 episode of Raw, Mahal stated that after he left WWE he "felt anger and rage" and had since "found inner peace" before defeating Jack Swagger. Afterwards, Mahal began competing on Main Event and Superstars, where he often traded wins and losses against Darren Young.

On the December 19 episode of Raw, a notably more lean and muscular Mahal began an alliance with Rusev after Mahal had a confrontation with Rusev's rival Enzo Amore before the two attacked Amore. On the January 2, 2017 episode of Raw, Mahal and Rusev defeated Amore's tag team partner Big Cass in a 2-on-1 handicap match. The following week on Raw, Mahal lost to Cass (who had Shawn Michaels at ringside) after Michaels performed the Sweet Chin Music on Rusev at ringside, which distracted Mahal. On the February 27 episode of Raw, Mahal and Rusev began to show tension after Rusev inadvertently distracted Mahal, causing the two to lose to The New Day (Big E, Kofi Kingston and Xavier Woods). The alliance between Mahal and Rusev ended at Fastlane on March 5, when Mahal informed Raw General Manager Mick Foley about his desire to return to singles competition, prompting Foley to place the duo in singles matches that night and with both Mahal and Rusev losing their respective matches against Cesaro and Big Show. This was done due to Rusev suffering a legit shoulder injury.

On April 3 at the WrestleMania 33 preshow, Mahal was the runner-up in the André the Giant Memorial Battle Royal, being eliminated last by Mojo Rawley after interference from Rob Gronkowski. On April 11, Mahal was moved to SmackDown as part of the Superstar Shake-up. On that night, he lost to Rawley after another interference from Gronkowski to end their feud.

Championship reigns (2017–2018) 

On the April 18 episode of SmackDown Live, Mahal won a six-pack challenge also involving Mojo Rawley, Dolph Ziggler, Erick Rowan, Luke Harper and Sami Zayn to earn a title match for the WWE Championship after interference from Mahal's new allies, The Singh Brothers (Samir and Sunil Singh). As part of the storyline, Mahal attacked WWE Champion Randy Orton, stealing the championship belt and costing Orton his match with Bray Wyatt at Payback on April 30. On the May 2 episode of SmackDown Live, SmackDown Commissioner Shane McMahon forced Mahal to return the title belt. Mahal went on to defeat Sami Zayn later in the episode and pin Randy Orton in a six-man tag team match to earn his team the victory the following week on SmackDown. On May 21 at Backlash, Mahal defeated Orton to win the WWE Championship (his first championship in WWE), becoming the 50th recognized WWE Champion and the first of Indian descent. After Mahal held a Punjabi celebration for his WWE Championship win, Orton invoked his rematch clause for Money in the Bank on June 18; with WWE Hall of Famers Bob Orton Jr., Ric Flair, and Sgt. Slaughter at ringside, Mahal defeated Orton in his first title defence. When an irate Orton demanded another match, McMahon granted it on the condition that Mahal would choose the stipulation, which was revealed to be a Punjabi Prison match. With Mahal referring to The Great Khali as his "personal hero", Khali eventually made his return at Battleground on July 23 to help Mahal defeat Orton and retain the title.

On the August 15 episode of SmackDown Live, Baron Corbin cashed in his Money in the Bank contract on Mahal, who had just lost to John Cena by disqualification. However, Mahal retained the title by pinning a distracted Corbin with a roll-up. In the following weeks, Mahal started a feud with Shinsuke Nakamura over the championship, retaining the title against him at SummerSlam on August 20 after interference by The Singh Brothers. In a rematch between the two, which took place on October 8 at Hell in a Cell, Mahal once again defeated Nakamura to retain the title. On the October 17 episode of SmackDown Live, Mahal challenged Universal Champion Brock Lesnar to a match at Survivor Series, However, Mahal lost the WWE Championship to AJ Styles on the November 7 episode of SmackDown Live, ending his reign at 170 days. Mahal received his rematch for the title against Styles at Clash of Champions on December 17, but he lost by submission. After Mahal lost his rematch, he continued his feud with Styles for the WWE Championship at live events throughout December and January, albeit without success.

After dropping the WWE Championship, Mahal was quickly inserted into the United States Championship picture after previous champion Dolph Ziggler vacated the title on the December 19 episode of SmackDown Live. He competed in an eight-man tournament to crown a new champion, defeating Tye Dillinger and Xavier Woods in the first round and semi-finals, respectively. The Singh Brothers attacked Bobby Roode. The following week, Mahal lost to Roode in the finals. At the Royal Rumble on January 28, Mahal entered the Rumble match at number 17, eliminating Big E and Xavier Woods and before being eliminated by Kofi Kingston. On the February 20 episode of SmackDown Live, Mahal got into a brawl with Bobby Roode and Randy Orton. After defeating both Roode and Orton, Mahal demanded that he should be United States Champion on the Fastlane preshow. When Orton won the United States Championship later that night, Mahal came out to taunt him but both Mahal and Orton received a Glorious DDT by former champion, Bobby Roode. On the March 20 episode of SmackDown Live, Orton was scheduled to defend the United States Championship at WrestleMania 34 in a triple threat against Mahal and Roode. The following week, Mahal teamed with Rusev to defeat Roode and Orton, leading to Rusev being added to the title match. At WrestleMania 34, Mahal pinned Rusev to capture the United States Championship. On April 16, as part of Superstar Shake-up, Mahal was traded back to Raw, taking the United States Championship with him. On the same night, though, he lost the championship to Jeff Hardy, ending his reign at just 8 days. On April 27 at Greatest Royal Rumble event, Mahal failed to win back the United States Championship from Hardy.

Brand switches and injuries (2018–2020) 

On the May 7 episode of Raw, after defeating Chad Gable, Mahal was denied entry into the triple threat Money in the Bank qualifying match by General Manager Kurt Angle, which led to Mahal interfering and costing Roman Reigns the match later that night. The following week, Mahal was scheduled to compete in another triple threat Money in the Bank qualifying match against Bobby Lashley and Elias, but he was attacked by Reigns before the match. At Money in the Bank, Mahal lost to Reigns.

The night after on Raw, Mahal returned as the "man who comes in peace" and defeated Chad Gable. In July, Mahal was inserted into the feud between Braun Strowman and Kevin Owens, defeating Strowman via countout and disqualification after distractions from Owens. On the August 13 episode of Raw, Mahal and Owens were defeated by Strowman and Finn Bálor when Strowman pinned Mahal. Starting in September Mahal competed in the second iteration of the WWE Mixed Match Challenge, teaming with Alicia Fox as "Mahalicia". The duo lost all of their matches save for the final one, in which they defeated Bobby Roode and Natalya, to advance to the playoffs as the lowest ranked team on Raw. In the quarterfinals they upset the highest-ranked team of Curt Hawkins and Ember Moon, after Mahal pinned Hawkins. Mahal and Fox qualified for the finals by defeating Apollo Crews and Bayley in the semi finals. At the TLC pay-per-view on December 16, Mahal and Fox lost the final to R-Truth and Carmella.

On January 27, 2019, Mahal participated in the Royal Rumble match, entering at number 7, before being eliminated by Johnny Gargano. At WrestleMania 35, Mahal competed in the André the Giant Memorial Battle Royal, but failed to win. As part of Superstar Shake-up, Mahal was moved to the SmackDown brand. In his first match back on the April 23 episode of SmackDown, he was scheduled to face Chad Gable, but the latter was blindsided by Lars Sullivan. On June 2, Mahal captured the 24/7 Championship after pinning champion R-Truth on a golf course, but dropped the title right back to Truth immediately afterwards due to a distraction by Carmella. Four days later, he defeated Truth for the title by pinning him on an airport tarmac, becoming a two-time 24/7 Champion, but Truth won the title back hours later when he pinned a sleeping Mahal inside of the airplane. On June 28, WWE announced that Mahal suffered a knee injury and it was reported that the injury would sideline him for six to twelve months. As part of the 2019 draft, Mahal was drafted to the Raw brand. On the April 27, 2020 episode of Raw, Mahal returned from injury, now sporting a shaved head, defeating Akira Tozawa. A month later, it was revealed that Mahal underwent another surgery to fix complications in his knee.

Various alliances (2021–present) 
After a nine-month absence, Mahal appeared at the Superstar Spectacle on January 26, 2021, reuniting with The Singh Brothers but lost to Drew McIntyre and Indus Sher (Rinku and Saurav) in a six-man tag team match. He returned again on the May 3 episode of Main Event, being accompanied by Shanky and Veer, where he defeated Jeff Hardy. In June, Mahal would begin with a feud with Drew McIntyre after Mahal took to question with the amount of title opportunities he had received over the past year. At Money in the Bank, Mahal interfered in the titular match attacking McIntyre with Shanky and Veer carrying him away from the match. The following night on Raw, Mahal, Shanky, and Veer gloated about costing McIntyre the match only for McIntyre to attack all three with a steel chair. At SummerSlam, Mahal lost to McIntyre.

As part of the 2021 Draft, both Mahal and Shanky were drafted to the SmackDown brand while Veer remained on the Raw brand, ending their alliance with Veer. In October, Mahal entered the King of the Ring tournament, where he defeated Kofi Kingston in the first round, but lost to Xavier Woods in the semi-finals. At Survivor Series, Mahal would be a part of The Rock's 25th anniversary battle royal, but was eliminated. On the April 15, 2022 edition of SmackDown, Mahal would challenge Ricochet for the Intercontinental Championship but was unsuccessful.

At New Year's Evil on January 10, 2023, Mahal returned to NXT for the first time since 2012, aligning himself with Indus Sher (Veer and Sanga) by attacking The Creed Brothers. On the February 21 episode of NXT, Mahal challenged Bron Breakker for the NXT Championship in a losing effort.

Other media 
Dhesi, as Jinder Mahal, appears in the wrestling video games WWE '13, WWE 2K14, WWE 2K18, WWE 2K19,  WWE 2K20, WWE 2K22 and WWE 2K23. 

In November 2021, Dhesi announced he was joining the cast of the ABC drama series Big Sky. He debuted on the 22nd episode ("Heart-shaped Charm") as Dhruv, the enforcer of Ren's brother Jag. Through April 7, 2022, he has appeared in 9 episodes of Big Sky.

Personal life 
Dhesi is an Indo-Canadian from Calgary, Alberta, Canada and currently resides in Tampa, Florida, United States. He is fluent in English and his family's native Indian languages of Hindi and Punjabi. Dhesi is friends with mixed martial artist and fellow Indo-Canadian, Arjan Bhullar. He is also good friends with American professional wrestler Heath and Scottish professional wrestler Drew McIntyre, and was a groomsman at McIntyre's wedding.

In 2017, Canadian politician Graham Sucha tabled three documents before the Assembly, formally congratulating Dhesi for winning the WWE Championship. During the 2019 Canadian federal election, Dhesi endorsed Jagmeet Singh of the New Democratic Party for Prime Minister.

Championships and accomplishments 

 All-Star Wrestling
 ASW Tag Team Championship (1 time) – with Gama Singh Jr.
 Continental Wrestling Entertainment
 CWE Heavyweight Championship (1 time)
 Prairie Wrestling Alliance
 PWA Canadian Tag Team Championship (1 time) – with Gama Singh Jr.
 PWA Heavyweight Championship (2 times)
 Pro Wrestling Illustrated
 Most Hated Wrestler of the Year (2017)
 Most Improved Wrestler of the Year (2017)
 Ranked No. 14 of the top 500 singles wrestlers in the PWI 500 in 2018
 Rolling Stone
 Comeback of the Year (2017)
 Stampede Wrestling
 Stampede Wrestling International Tag Team Championship (2 times) – with Gama Singh Jr.
Wrestling Observer Newsletter
Most Overrated (2017)
 WrestleCrap
 Gooker Award (2017) – 
 WWE
 WWE Championship (1 time)
 WWE United States Championship (1 time)
 WWE 24/7 Championship (2 times)

References

External links 

 
 
 
 
 Raj Singh's Inoki Genome Federation profile 

1986 births
Living people
Canadian people of Indian descent
Canadian people of Punjabi descent
Canadian Sikhs
Canadian sportspeople of Indian descent
Canadian expatriate professional wrestlers in the United States
Canadian male professional wrestlers
NWA/WCW/WWE United States Heavyweight Champions
Professional wrestlers from Calgary
Sportspeople from Amritsar
Stampede Wrestling alumni
University of Calgary alumni
WWE 24/7 Champions
WWE Champions
21st-century professional wrestlers
Stampede Wrestling International Tag Team Champions